The Museum of Turkish Aeronautical Association, shortly THK Museum, is a museum owned by the Turkish Aeronautical Association (THK) in Altındağ, Ankara dedicated to the civil aviation in Turkey.

Location and access
The museum is located at Hipodrom Cad. 2, Ulus, Ankara. It is open everyday but Mondays between 9:00–18:00 in winter months and 10:00–19:00 in summer time, and receives around 15,000 visitors annually.

Museum

The historic parachute tower is situated within the museum's yard, where original and replica aircraft are on display. The museum building holds various documents, photos and objects related to the history of civil aviation in Turkey and the world.

Photos of the Turkey's first aircraft factory, TOMTAŞ (which was in production in the 1920s), diverse uniforms, medals and decorations used by the THK (Türk Hava Kurumu), stamps printed for the THK, and mockups of the THK's training facilities in other cities are on display in the museum. Additionally, the museum contains mockups related to the flying tests carried out by the 17th-century Ottoman figures Lagari Hasan Çelebi and Hezarfen Ahmet Çelebi.

Parachute tower

The parachute tower was built by Turkish and Russian engineers in 1937. The -high tower conforms to the standards of the Fédération Aéronautique Internationale (FAI). It offers recreational parachute jumping between May and October. Two cranes are available for holding the parachute of the jumper.

An identical parachute tower is located in Izmir, Turkey.

See also
Istanbul Aviation Museum
Ankara Aviation Museum

References

Museums in Ankara
Aerospace museums in Turkey
Transport museums in Turkey
2002 establishments in Turkey
Museums established in 2002
Altındağ, Ankara